The Battle of Kollum was a military engagement that took place on 16 July 1581 during the Eighty Years' War and the Anglo–Spanish War. The battle was fought between an English and Dutch force under John Norreys and Diederik Sonoy respectively, and a Spanish force under George van Lalaing, the Count of Rennenberg. The Dutch and English were victorious, and as a result of the defeat Rennenberg, already ill, died two days later.

In March 1580 George van Lalaing, the Count Rennenberg had turned against William the Silent, and then declared for Spain. This caused outrage amongst the Dutch with many even coming over to the side of the rebels. Rennenberg led an army to lay siege at Steenwijk but was defeated when an Anglo-Dutch relief army under John Norreys arrived.

Many of Rennenberg's army were sick and in a mutinous mood; they fled east towards Groningen and with Norreys in pursuit not too far behind. Rennenberg, hoping to catch his pursuers off guard, turned and faced them at Kollum. Norreys attacked almost at once sweeping away the Spanish forces from the field who then fled all the way to Groningen itself. The battle was one sided and a heavy defeat; Spanish casualties were heavy with 700 killed, wounded, or captured and in addition the loss of all their military baggage and all four of their field guns. Rennenberg, who had been too ill to take command, died four days later at Groningen.

Rennenberg's successor Francisco Verdugo soon attacked again at Noordhorn; this time Norreys was defeated in the pitched battle.

References 
Citations

Bibliography
 
 

Kollum
1581 in the Dutch Republic
1581 in the Habsburg Netherlands
16th-century military history of the Kingdom of England
16th-century military history of Spain
Eighty Years' War (1566–1609)
Kollum
Kollum
Kollum
Kollum
Kollum
Noardeast-Fryslân